Jimi Famurewa is a British journalist and food critic.

Early life
Famurewa was born in London to Nigerian immigrants. He grew up in London.

Career
As a freelance journalist, Famurewa has written on diverse subjects for publications including The Guardian, GQ, Empire, Wired, Grazia and Time Out.

He started working at the Evening Standard in 2015. He became the food critic for their ES Magazine in September 2018, before being made the Chief Restaurant Critic of the paper in December 2020, with his first piece appearing in January 2021. His ES Magazine column won him the 2020 Restaurant Writing Award from the Guild of Food Writers. He won the award again in 2021.

He wrote the short story "Teddybird" (2017) that was shortlisted in the Guardian and 4th Estate's BAME Short Story Prize.

He co-hosts a podcast for Waitrose. He has appeared on TV, including on the BBC's Masterchef, Masterchef: The Professionals and Step Up to the Plate.

Personal life 
Famurewa lives in south-east London with a wife and two children.

References

External links 
 Website
 
 "Teddybird"

Living people
People from London
British male journalists
British restaurant critics
British television personalities
21st-century British male writers
Year of birth missing (living people)